Alun John Pugh (born 9 June 1955) is a Welsh politician who served as the Member of the National Assembly for Wales (AM) for Clwyd West from 1999 to 2007. A member of Welsh Labour, he is a former Welsh Assembly Government Minister for Culture, Welsh Language and Sport. Pugh lives in Ruthin but resided in Deganwy, Conwy for much of his time in North Wales. He has learnt Welsh as an adult.

Early life
Pugh was born in Llwynypia, Mid Glamorgan, into a poor coal mining family. He has a degree in business finance and post-graduate qualifications in computer science and education, and moved to North Wales from Newcastle Upon Tyne.

Professional career
Pugh was Head of Business Studies at Coleg Llandrillo Cymru, a large further education college. Four years later, he was promoted to an associate principalship at West Cheshire College. Following the 2007 elections he took a mountaineering sabbatical in the Himalayas, and on his return to Wales was appointed as Director of the Snowdonia Society, a campaigning environmental charity. He was a columnist for the Daily Post (North Wales) and ran consultancy projects before his re selection for the 2015 general election.

Political career
Pugh was elected in the National Assembly for Wales election in 1999 to the marginal Clwyd West seat of the National Assembly for Wales. Became the Deputy Minister for Economic Development in October 2000. He was re-elected in 2003 as well as being appointed to the post of Minister for Culture, Welsh Language and Sport in the Welsh Assembly Government. Pugh remained an Assembly Member until his 2007 election defeat by  Conservative Darren Millar by a margin of 1,596 votes. Pugh stood in the new constituency of Arfon in the 2010 Westminster election but narrowly lost  to Plaid Cymru's Hywel Williams by a margin of 1,455 votes. He also contested the seat at the 2015 general election, again against Hywel Williams, where he was defeated by a larger margin of 3,668 votes.

References
BBC Website September 1999
Alun Pugh Welsh Labour Party profile

Offices held

1955 births
Living people
Welsh Labour members of the Senedd
Members of the Welsh Assembly Government
Wales AMs 1999–2003
Wales AMs 2003–2007
People from Llwynypia
Welsh-speaking politicians
Labour Party (UK) parliamentary candidates